Lara Heta (née Petera, born 21 December 1978) is a professional squash player from New Zealand.

In 2004, Petera finished runner-up in the women's doubles event at the World Doubles Squash Championships, partnering Louise Crome. Petera and Crome also paired up in the 2006 Commonwealth Games, just missing out on a medal.

References

New Zealand female squash players
1978 births
Living people
Squash players at the 2006 Commonwealth Games
Commonwealth Games competitors for New Zealand